Richard Brick House is located in Salem, Salem County, New Jersey, United States. The house was built in 1750 and was added to the National Register of Historic Places on May 13, 1976.

See also
National Register of Historic Places listings in Salem County, New Jersey

References

Houses on the National Register of Historic Places in New Jersey
Houses completed in 1750
Houses in Salem County, New Jersey
National Register of Historic Places in Salem County, New Jersey
Salem, New Jersey
New Jersey Register of Historic Places